The Salesians of Don Bosco (SDB), formally known as the Society of Saint Francis de Sales, is a religious congregation of men in the Catholic Church, founded in 1869 by Italian priest Saint John Bosco to help poor and migrant youngsters during the Industrial Revolution. The congregation was named after Saint Francis de Sales, a 17th-century bishop of Geneva.

The Salesians' charter describes the society's mission as "the Christian perfection of its associates obtained by the exercise of spiritual and corporal works of charity towards the young, especially the poor, and the education of boys to the priesthood". Its associated women's institute is the Salesian Sisters of Don Bosco, while the lay movement is the Association of Salesian Cooperators.

History
In 1845 Don John Bosco ("Don" being a traditional Italian honorific for priest) opened a night school for boys in Valdocco, now part of the municipality of Turin in Italy. In the following years, he opened several more schools, and in 1857 drew up a set of rules for his helpers. This rule was approved definitively in 1873 by Pope Pius IX as the Rule of the Society of Saint Francis de Sales. The Society grew rapidly, with houses established in France and Argentina within a year of the Society's formal recognition. Its official print organ, Salesian Bulletin, was first published in 1877.

Over the next decade the Salesians expanded into Austria, Britain, Spain, and several countries in South America. The death of Don Bosco in 1888 did not slow down the Society's growth. By 1911 the Salesians were established throughout the world, including Colombia, China, India, South Africa, Tunisia, Venezuela and the United States.

The Society continues to operate worldwide; in 2021, it counted 14,232 members in 1,703 houses. It has presences in 134 countries.

Symbols

Coat of arms 
The Salesian coat of arms was designed by Professor Boidi. It was published for the first time in a circular letter of Don Bosco on 8 December 1885. It consist of a shining star, the large anchor, and the heart on fire to symbolize the theological virtues of Faith, Hope and Charity. The figure of Saint Francis de Sales recalls the patron of the society. The small wood in the lower part refers to the founder of the society; the high mountains signify the heights of perfection towards which members strive; the interwoven palm and laurel that enfold the shield on either side are emblematic of the prize reserved for a virtuous and sacrificial life. The motto Da mihi animas, caetera tolle ("Give me souls, take away the rest") is featured at the bottom.

Logo
The Salesian logo is made up of two superimposed images.

In the background is a globe to represent the worldwide reach of the Salesians, and a stylized "S" in white is formed within the globe, resembling a snaking road representing an educational journey for the youth.

In the foreground is an arrow pointing upwards, resting on three perpendicular legs on top of which are three closed circles, making a stylized image of three people: the first of these in the middle and taller than the others is the point of the arrow, and the other two beside it appear as it were to be embraced by the central figure. These three stylized figures represent Saint John Bosco reaching out to the young, and his call for Salesians to continue his work. The three stylized figures with the arrow pointing upwards can also be viewed as a house dwelling with a sloping roof and three pillars holding it up, represents John Bosco's pedagogy of Reason, Religion and Loving Kindness.

The logo combines elements from those of the German and Brazilian provinces. The idea of combining the two came out of suggestions from an enquiry about the new logo conducted throughout the Congregation and from contributions by the General Council. It is designed with the central theme "Don Bosco and the Salesians walking with the young through the world." The artistic work of combining the two was carried out by the designer Fabrizio Emigli, from the Litos Company, in Rome.

Organization

The Salesians of Don Bosco are headed by the Rector Major and the society's general council, while each of the ninety-four geographical provinces is headed by a Provincial. These officers serve six-year terms; the Rector Major and the members of the general council are elected by the General Chapter, which meets every six years or upon the death of the Rector Major. Each local Salesian community is headed by a superior, called a Rector (or more commonly, "Director"), who is appointed to a three-year term and can be renewed for a second three-year term.

Since 2014, the Rector Major of the Salesians is the Very Reverend Father Ángel Fernández Artime.

Works
Salesian communities primarily operate shelters for homeless or at-risk youths; schools; technical, vocational, and language instruction centers for youths and adults; and boys' clubs and community centers. In some areas they run parish churches. Salesians are also active in publishing and other public communication activities, as well as mission work, especially in Asia (Siberia - in the Yakutsk area), Africa, and South America (Yanomami). The Salesian Bulletin is now published in fifty-two editions, in thirty languages.

In 1988, the Salesians branched to create the Salesian Youth Movement. Then in the 1990s, the Salesians launched new works in the area of tertiary education, and today have a network of over 58 colleges and universities. The official university of the Salesian Society is the Salesian Pontifical University in Rome.

Sexual abuse scandal 

A number of schools and churches established under the Salesians have been at the center of child sex abuse scandals, including Mary Help of Christians in Tampa, Florida. Due to ongoing sexual assault lawsuits and settlements, several boarding schools were closed.

Notable members

Saints and Blesseds
Saint John Bosco
Saint Dominic Savio
Saint Michael Rua
Saint Aloysius Versiglia, Bishop and Martyr
Saint Callixtus Caravario, martyr
Saint Stephen Sandor, martyr
Saint Artémides Zatti
Blessed Luis Variara
Blessed Titus Zeman
Venerable August Hlond

Other notable members

Alfons Maria Stickler, cardinal
Angelo Amato, cardinal
Antonio María Javierre Ortas, cardinal
Carlo Braga, priest
Carlos Filipe Ximenes Belo, bishop
Giovanni Cagliero, cardinal
Ignacio Velasco, cardinal
Javier de Nicoló, priest
Joseph Zen Ze-kiun, cardinal
Lucas Van Looy, bishop
Massimo Palombella, priest
Miguel Obando y Bravo, cardinal
Óscar Andrés Rodríguez Maradiaga, cardinal
Raúl Silva Henríquez, cardinal
Raffaele Farina, cardinal
Rosalio José Castillo Lara, cardinal
Stefan Czmil, bishop
Štěpán Trochta, cardinal
Tarcisio Bertone, cardinal
Broderick Pabillo, bishop
Leo Drona, bishop
Vincenzo Savio, bishop

See also

Don Bosco School
List of Salesian schools
Rector Major of the Salesians

Croatian Salesian Province of Saint Don Bosco
Salesian Pastoral Youth Service, a Maltese Salesian developmental team of religious and lay youth leaders
Salesians in Hungary

Salesians in the Philippines
Sexual abuse scandal in the Salesian order
Bartolome Blanco Marquez, martyr of the religious persecutions of the Spanish Civil War
Giuseppe Moja
Jan Tyranowski, mentor of the young Karol Wojtyla, later to be Pope John Paul II

References

External links

 (multilingual)
Salesian Missions

 
 
1874 establishments in Italy
Catholic missionary orders
Catholic teaching orders
Founders of Indian schools and colleges
Religious organizations established in 1874